Iona is an island of the Inner Hebrides, Scotland, with particular significance in the history of Christianity in Scotland.

Derived from the Scottish island of Iona

Place names

Australia
Iona, Darlinghurst, a heritage-listed house and former hospital in Sydney, New South Wales
Iona, Victoria in eastern Victoria
Iona Gas Plant in Western Victoria near Port Campbell

Canada
Iona, Nova Scotia (on Cape Breton Island)
Iona Island (British Columbia)
Iona, Newfoundland and Labrador
 Iona Station and Iona in Ontario

United States
Iona, Florida
Iona, Idaho
Iona, Indiana
Iona, Minnesota
Iona, New Jersey
Iona, South Dakota
Iona Island (New York)

People
Iona (name)
Iona Brown, violinist
Iona Campagnolo, Canadian politician
Iona Fyfe (born 1998), Scottish singer
Iona Opie, researcher of children's lore
Iona Wynter, Jamaican athlete

Ships
 Iona I 1855 J&G Thomson paddle steamer, sunk off Fort Matilda, 1862
 1864 MacBrayne paddle steamer
 1970 MacBrayne ferry
 2020 P&O Cruises cruise ship

Schools
Iona University, a Catholic university located in New Rochelle, New York, USA
Iona Preparatory School, a Catholic high school located in New Rochelle, New York, USA
Iona Catholic Secondary School, a member of the Dufferin-Peel Catholic District School Board, located in Mississauga, Ontario, Canada
Iona College (Windsor, Ontario), a affiliated college of the University of Windsor in Windsor, Ontario, Canada founded by the United Church of Canada
Iona Presentation College, Perth, a Catholic high school located in Perth, Western Australia
Iona College (Queensland), a Catholic school located in Brisbane, Queensland, Australia
Iona College, Havelock North, a Presbyterian girls' school in Havelock North, Hawke's Bay, New Zealand

Other uses
The Iona Community, an ecumenical Christian community based on the island and in Glasgow
Iona National Airways, the first commercial airline in Ireland
Iona (band), a progressive rock band from the UK
Iona (album), their first album
"Iona", a single from Joy (album), by Scottish band the Skids and Mike Oldfield
Iona Church, Port Chalmers, a Presbyterian church in Port Chalmers, Dunedin, New Zealand
Iona (film), a 2015 film starring Ruth Negga

Of separate origin
Iona, a Russianized form of the name Jonah
Iona Yakir
Iona Nikitchenko
Iona or Ionah, Hawaiianized form of the name Jonah used by Jonah Piikoi
Iona (spider), a genus of jumping spiders
Iona National Park in the Namibe province of Angola
Iona, Angola, a Comuna (parish) in the Tômbwa municipality

Acronyms
IONA, an acronym for Islands of the North Atlantic, an alternative term for the British Isles
IONA Technologies PLC, a software company with headquarters in Dublin, Ireland

Fictional characters
Iona, Shield of Emeria, a legendary angel from Zendikar, a Magic: The Gathering expansion set
Iona, a Fog Mental Model from Arpeggio of Blue Steel
Hikawa Iona (Cure Fortune), character of HappinessCharge PreCure!
Iona MacLean, TV character from Monarch of the Glen